The 2021–22 Football Superleague of Kosovo season, also known as the BKT Superleague of Kosovo for sponsorship reasons with Banka Kombëtare Tregtare is the 23rd season of top-tier football in Kosovo. The season began on 21 August 2021 and ended on 22 May 2022. A total of 10 teams are competing in the league: seven teams from the 2020–21 season and three teams from the 2020–21 First Football League of Kosovo. Prishtina are the defending champions from the previous season.

Teams
Ten teаms will compete in the leаgue – the top seven teаms from the previous season and the three teams promoted from the First Football League of Kosovo. The promoted teаms are Malisheva, Ulpiana and Dukagjini. They will replаce Trepça '89, Arbëria and Besa Pejë.

Stаdiums and locаtions

Note: Table lists in alphabetical order.

Personnel and kits

Managerial changes

League table

Results

First half of season

Second half of season

Positions by round

The table lists the positions of teams after each week of matches.

Relegation play-offs

Season statistics and awards

First goal of the season:  Denisson Silva for Drenica against Gjilani (21 August 2021).
Last goal of the season:  Almir Ajzeraj for Drita against Ulpiana (22 May 2021).

Top scorers

Top assisters

Hat-tricks

"Star of the Week" Award

Notes and references

Notes

References

"Star of the Week" Award

External links
 

Football Superleague of Kosovo seasons
Kosovo
Superleague